The Mesochora Dam is concrete-face rock-fill dam on the Acheloos River near Mesochora in Trikala, Greece.

The idea for an Acheloos to Thessaly diversion project was first envisioned in the 1930s but a lack of funding precluded construction. Interest in the project was revived in 1984 and what was supposed to be a small dam at Mesochora apart from the diversion project was increased in size to support to river diversion. Over the next several years there was a series of legal battles that led to construction stalling, most recently in 2005. Opponents of the scheme cite significant changes to the environment, flooding of villages and that the scheme will divert  of water annually from the Acheloos. Supporters call on the benefit to the lucrative cotton crops it will help irrigate and the dam's planned 162 MW hydroelectric power plant. The Mesochora Dam was completed in January 2001 but the reservoir has yet to be filled and the power plant has subsequently not been commissioned due to legal battles.

See also

 Energy in Greece
 Renewable energy in Greece

References

External links

Dams in Greece
Hydroelectric power stations in Greece
Concrete-face rock-fill dams
Dams completed in 2001
Dams on the Achelous River
Dam controversies
Trikala (regional unit)